Joondanna is a suburb of Perth, Western Australia. Its local government area is the City of Stirling.
There is a Catholic church, St Denis, and a small Catholic primary school of the same name.
Joondanna is named after a farm said to be owned by an early settler in the area.

Joondanna Heights was the first declared township in the Perth Road District (now the City of Stirling) - the Government Gazette of 17 November 1939 described its boundaries as Balcatta Beach Road (now North Beach Drive, Tuart Hill), Main Street, Wanneroo Road, and what was then the City of Perth boundary (Green Street, now the City of Vincent boundary).

Footballer Chris Judd lived in Joondanna when he played for the West Coast Eagles, and Paralympian Louise Sauvage grew up in the suburb.

References

Suburbs of Perth, Western Australia
Suburbs in the City of Stirling